Pandora is an American science fiction television series that aired on The CW. The series premiered on July 16, 2019. It consisted of two seasons of 23 episodes, airing its final episode on December 13, 2020.

Premise
Pandora is a sci-fi action series about a young woman named Jax who survives an attack on the New Portland colony. She loses her parents in the attack and decides to investigate on her own after the official investigation ends without conclusion. Jax returns to Earth and enrolls at the Space Training Academy, where she makes new friends who assist her in her adventures and enemies who are after her secret.

Cast and characters
 Priscilla Quintana as Jacqueline "Jax" Zhou, aka Pandora, a young woman whose parents were killed in a surprise attack on the planet colony they were living on, and who arrives to Earth Space Training Academy as a student, but soon discovers that there are things about herself that she doesn't know or understand.
 Oliver Dench as Xander Duvall, Professor Osborn's teaching assistant at Earth Space Training Academy, he is hiding secrets from Jax despite being attracted to her.
 Raechelle Banno as Atria Nine (season 1), a fellow student at Earth Space Training Academy and a good friend of Jax.
 John Harlan Kim as Greg Li (season 1; guest season 2), a fellow student at Earth Space Training Academy and was briefly Jax's boyfriend.
 Ben Radcliffe as Ralen, an alien Zatarian and a fellow student at Earth Space Training Academy, and who is generally distrusted by Earth students due to the Zatarian's earlier war with Earth.
 Banita Sandhu as Delaney Pilar (season 1), a fellow student at Earth Space Training Academy and Jax's roommate.
 Martin Bobb-Semple as Thomas James Ross (season 1), a fellow student at Earth Space Training Academy and Jax's friend.
 Noah Huntley as Professor Donovan Osborn, Jax's uncle, and a professor at the Earth Space Training Academy who knows more about Jax and her past than he's revealing.
 Akshay Kumar as Jett Annamali (season 2; guest season 1), a trouble-making student who was suspended from Earth Space Training Academy, but who has returned looking for forgiveness and a second chance.
 Nicole Castillo-Mavromatis as Zazie (season 2), Jax's new roommate at Earth Space Training Academy.

The following cast members are only credited as part of the main cast in the episodes in which they appear.

 Tehmina Sunny as Regan Fried (season 1), the daughter of industrialist Harlan Fried.
 Vikash Bhai as Martin Shral, a professor at Earth Space Training Academy who becomes a mentor to some of the students including Jax.
 Tommie Earl Jenkins as Ellison Pevney (season 1), a professor at Earth Space Training Academy.
 Manu Bennett as Leone Vokk  (season 1)
 Tina Casciani as Tierney (season 2; recurring season 1), who has unexplained ties to Thomas's father, and who is ultimately revealed to be more powerful than first assumed. She is head of the Hypatia Crime Syndicate. 
 Tegen Short as Matta (season 2), Ralen's wife from Zatar. Amy McPherson played the character in season 1.
 Shani Erez as Admiral Meredith Lucas (season 2), a leader in EarthComm, and Xander's and Jax's supervisor
 Roxanne McKee as Eve (season 2), Jax's mother whom Jax thought had died in the attack on the colony. Charisma Carpenter portrayed the character in the first-season finale.
 Luke Fetherston as Harlan Fried (season 2; recurring season 1), an industrialist who transferred his consciousness into a younger clone body.

Ben Cross appears in the first season as the original Harlan Fried.

Episodes

Season 1 (2019)
Each episode of the first season is named after a Bob Dylan song title except episode seven, which is named for Dylan's 30th studio album.

Season 2 (2020)

Production
Pandora was created and written by Mark A. Altman, who is also executive producer along with Steve Kriozere, Thomas P. Vitale, Karine Martin, and Chris Philip. Pandora was produced by Radioactive Fishtank, Vital Signs Entertainment and Starlings Television. The filming for Pandora took place in Bulgaria. Pandora premiered on July 16, 2019, as mid-summer entry during the 2018–19 U.S. network television season. On October 16, 2019, it was announced that The CW Pandora had been renewed for a second season by The CW, which premiered on October 4, 2020. In May 2021, it was revealed that Pandora was quietly cancelled after two seasons.

In October 2021, the producers of Pandora announced plans of seeking a different network for season 3  with production expected to start in early 2022 however nothing materialized.

Reception

Critical response
Daniel Fienberg of The Hollywood Reporter criticized the show for "some of the cheapest and flattest-looking visuals", adding, "There's no character I particularly liked, no relationship that seems particularly interesting and no mystery embedded in the pilot to which I'd like to get any answers." The review aggregator website Rotten Tomatoes reported a 14% approval rating with an average score of 4.67/10, based on seven reviews.

Ratings

Season 1

Season 2

Notes

References

External links

 
 

2010s American LGBT-related television series
2020s American LGBT-related television series
2010s American science fiction television series
2020s American science fiction television series
2019 American television series debuts
2020 American television series endings
Bisexuality-related television series
English-language television shows
The CW original programming
Space adventure television series
Television shows filmed in Bulgaria
Television series by Sony Pictures Television